The 1995 Bank of Ireland All-Ireland Senior Football Championship was the 109th staging of the All-Ireland Senior Football Championship, the Gaelic Athletic Association's premier inter-county Gaelic football tournament. The championship began on 21 May 1995 and ended on 17 September 1995.

Down entered the championship as the defending champions, however, they were defeated by Donegal in the Ulster preliminary round.

On 17 September 1995, Dublin won the championship following a 1-10 to 0-12 defeat of Tyrone in the All-Ireland final. This was their 22nd All-Ireland title and their first in twelve championship seasons.

Tyrone's Peter Canavan was the championship's top scorer with 1-38. Dublin's Paul Clarke was the choice for Texaco Footballer of the Year, while Tyrone's Peter Canavan was selected as the Powerscreen Footballer of the Year.

Provincial championships

Connacht Senior Football Championship

Quarter-finals

 
Semi-finals

Final

Leinster Senior Football Championship

Preliminary round

Quarter-finals

Semi-finals

Final

Munster Senior Football Championship

Quarter-finals

Semi-finals

Final

Ulster Senior Football Championship
Preliminary round

Quarter-finals

Semi-finals

Final

All-Ireland Senior Football Championship
Semi-finals

Final

Championship statistics

Top scorers

Overall

Single game

Miscellaneous

 The Leinster quarter-final between Laois and Carlow ends in disarray and confusion over the score. A late Mick Turley point which gave Laois the lead was later deemed to have been a wide. At a subsequent meeting the Leinster Council voted to adopt the referee's report in spite of television replays showing that the ball had gone wide. Laois offered Carlow a replay of the match, which they subsequently won by four points.
 Cork being Munster champions for the third year in a row won their seventh Munster title in nine years.

References